The Future of War is the second studio album  by Atari Teenage Riot.

Faster and harder than their previous effort, the album sees the band's only female member at the time, Hanin Elias, providing vocals for a larger share of the songs. In May 2002, The Future of War was placed on the Bundesprüfstelle für jugendgefährdende Medien index in Germany, meaning that it may not be advertised or sold to minors. According to band member Alec Empire, Future of War was notable for its "left-rooted critique of the 'modern' high-tech-war, as we had seen it all some years previously during the Gulf War."

Track listing

Samples credits

 "Sick To Death" samples "Sick of You" by The Users, "Decadent Jew" by The Nuns, and anime "Urotsukidoji II: Legend of the Demon Womb" (English dubbed version).
 "Fuck All" samples "Pay to Cum" by Bad Brains.
 "Destroy 2000 Years of Culture" samples "Dead Skin Mask" by Slayer.
 "Heatwave" samples "Supertouch" by Bad Brains.
 "Not Your Business" samples "Back to Bataan" by The Maids.
 "Deutschland (Has Gotta Die!)" samples "I'm In Love With Today" by The Users

References

External links
 Atari Teenage Riot at MySpace
 Official Digital Hardcore Recordings site

1997 albums
Atari Teenage Riot albums
Grand Royal albums